Rushmoor Arena is an outdoor arena in Aldershot. It is a secure area of 28 Hectares (68 acres) surrounded by a security fence which is mainly hidden by trees.  The central arena is a grassed level area of 4 Hectares with grassed amphitheatre banking on 3 sides.  The arena was built by the British Army in 1923 for The Aldershot Military Tattoo.  The venue has been used as a filming location and hosted many events, including The Aldershot Command Tattoo, The Aldershot Army Show, a three-day festival, stunt shows, car shows and Rally Car racing.

Motor Sports
An oval race track has been built on one of the arena's car parks, and regularly holds Stock Car Racing organised by Spedeworth.  The main arena has been used for rally car racing including the Tempest Rally, and also supercar driving experiences.

The Aldershot Command Searchlight Tattoo
The Tattoo originated from a special display for Queen Victoria in 1894 and soon became an event in itself.  Its growing popularity required the building of a venue to cater for the large numbers of people attending.  Rushmoor Arena was built in 1923 and the Tattoo became a national spectacle with over 5,000 soldiers taking part.  The Tattoo had annual crowds of up to 500,000 people, and over 58,000 cars.

Location
Rushmoor Arena is located on the West side of Aldershot off Bourley Road, close to the Wellington Statue, Aldershot. There is space for 10,000 cars in close proximity to the arena.

See also
 List of contemporary amphitheatres

References

External links
 Rushmoor Arena website
 The Aldershot Tattoo

Amphitheatres in the United Kingdom
Buildings and structures in Aldershot